Antonia Ramel (born 2 July 1985, Bettna) is a Swedish equestrian athlete. She competed at the 2019 European Championships in Rotterdam where she won team bronze with the Swedish dressage team. Her younger sister Juliette Ramel competed at the Rio Olympics in 2016. Together they were in the bronze-winning team in Rotterdam.

Ramel was part of the Swedish team during the 2020 Olympic Games in Tokyo, after Patrik Kittel withdrew from the competition due an injury of his horse Well Done de la Rouche. Ramel finished 35th in the individual competition and 6th with the team.

References

1985 births
Living people
Swedish female equestrians
Swedish dressage riders
Equestrians at the 2020 Summer Olympics
Olympic equestrians of Sweden

Antonia